Zaza Nadiradze (born 2 September 1993) is a Georgian sprint canoeist. He competed in the men's C-1 200 metres event at the 2016 Summer Olympics.

References

External links

1993 births
Living people
Male canoeists from Georgia (country)
Olympic canoeists of Georgia (country)
Canoeists at the 2016 Summer Olympics
People from Mtskheta
ICF Canoe Sprint World Championships medalists in Canadian
European Games competitors for Georgia (country)
Canoeists at the 2019 European Games